Darreh-ye Bizhan may refer to:

Darreh-ye Bizhan-e Olya
Darreh-ye Bizhan-e Sofla
Darreh-ye Bizhan-e Vosta